Harvey Cantor is an American immunologist known for his studies of the development and immunological function of T lymphocytes.   Cantor is currently the Baruj Benacerraf Professor of Microbiology & Immunobiology at the Harvard Medical School.

Research 

Cantor's early studies focused on the development and function of lymphocytes derived from the thymus (T-lymphocytes or T cells). In particular, his research addressed whether the multiple immunological functions of T cells were invested in a single lineage or represented the specialized activities of distinct T cell subsets. This approach depended on the use of antibodies to cell surface glycoproteins or “markers” that might identify specialized subsets of lymphocytes with particular immunologic functions.  This experimental approach was also used to investigate other lymphocyte populations, including “natural killer” cells. His laboratory continues to investigate the molecular and cellular elements that regulate the immune response and maintain self-tolerance.

Education 

Cantor received an A.B. from Columbia University and M.D. from New York University School of Medicine, followed by fellowship training at the National Institutes of Health (NIH) in Bethesda, MD with Richard Asofsky and as an NIH Special Fellow at the National Institute for Medical Research in Mill Hill, London. Following a residency in medicine at Stanford, he joined the faculty of Harvard Medical School in 1974 as an assistant professor of medicine and, since 1979, has been professor of pathology. In 1998, Cantor was appointed chair of the Department of Cancer Immunology & AIDS at the Dana-Farber Cancer Institute and in 2007 he was honored by appointment to the Baruj Benacerraf Professorship at Harvard Medical School.

Awards 

Cantor was elected to the National Academy of Sciences (2002), the American Association for the Advancement of Science (2005) and the American Academy of Arts & Sciences (2010). More recently, Cantor received the 2019 Excellence in Mentoring Award  and was elected as a Distinguished Fellow of the American Association of Immunologists in 2020.

References

Published papers 

 Huber B, Devinsky O, Gershon RK, Cantor H.  Cell-mediated immunity:  Delayed hypersensitivity and cytotoxic responses are mediated by different T-cell subclasses. J Exp Med 143: 1534–39.
 Glimcher L, Shen FW, Cantor H. Identification of a cell-surface antigen selectively expressed on the natural killer cell. J Exp Med 145: 1–9.
 Rao A, Ko WW, Faas SJ, Cantor H.  Binding of antigen in the absence of histocompatibility proteins by arsonate-reactive T cell clones. Cell 36:879-888.
 Rao A, Faas S and H. Cantor.  Analogues which compete for antigen binding to an arsonate-reactive T cell clone inhibit the functional response to arsonate. Cell 36:889-95.
 Patarca R, Freeman GJ, Singh RP, Wei FW, Durfee T, Blattner F, Regnier DC, Kozak CA, Mock BA, Morse III CA, Jerrells TR, Cantor H. Structural and functional studies of the Eta-1 (Early-T-lymphocyte-activation-1; Osteopontin) gene: Definition of a novel T-cell dependent response associated with genetic resistance to bacterial infection.  J Exp Med 170:145-161.
 Avery AC, Zhao ZS, Rodriquez A, Bikoff EK, Soheilian M, Foster CS, Cantor H.. Resistance to herpes stromal keratitis conferred by an IgG2a-derived peptide.  Nature 376: 431–434. 
 Weber GF, Ashkar S, Glimcher MJ, Cantor H.  Receptor-ligand interaction between Osteopontin (Eta-1) and CD44.  Science 271: 509–512.
 Zhao ZS, Granucci F, Yeh L, Schaffer PA, Cantor H. Molecular mimicry by herpes simplex virus-1: Autoimmune disease after viral infection. Science 279: 1344–1347.
 Pestano GA, Zhou Y, Trimble LA,  Daley J, Weber GF, Cantor H. Inactivation of mis-selected CD8 T cells by CD8 gene methylation and cell death. Science 284:  1187–1191.
 Ashkar S, Weber GF, Panoutsakopoulou V, Sanchirico ME, Jansson M, Zawaideh S, Rittling SR, Denhardt DT, Glimcher MJ, Cantor H. Eta-1 (Osteopontin): an early component of type 1 (cell-mediated) immunity.  Science 287: 860–864.
 †Panoutsakopoulou V, †Sanchirico ME, Huster KM, Jansson M, Granucci F, Shim DJ, Wucherpfennig KW, Cantor H. Analysis of the relationship between viral infection and autoimmune disease.  Immunity 15:137-147.
 McCarty N, Paust S, Ikizawa K, Dan I, Li X, Cantor H.  Signaling by MINK plays an essential role in negative selection of autoreactive thymocytes. Nature Immunology 6:65-72.
 Shinohara ML, Lu L, Bu J, Werneck MBF, Kobayashi KS, Glimcher LH, Cantor H.  Osteopontin expression is essential for IFN-γ production by plasmacytoid dendritic cells. Nature Immunology 7, 498–506.
 Shinohara ML, Kim J-H, Garcia VA, Cantor H. Engagement of the Type I interferon receptor on dendritic cells inhibits promotion of Th17 cells: central role of intracellular Osteopontin.  Immunity 29: 68–78.

† equal contributors

External links 

 Dana-Farber Cancer Institute profile 
 Dana-Farber/Harvard Cancer Center (DF/HCC) profile 
 Harvard Medical School Program in Immunology profile 

American immunologists
Living people
Columbia College (New York) alumni
Harvard Medical School faculty
New York University faculty
Year of birth missing (living people)
Members of the United States National Academy of Sciences
New York University Grossman School of Medicine alumni